The Jingkang Incident, also known as the Humiliation of Jingkang and the Disorders of the Jingkang Period, was an episode of invasions and war crimes that took place in 1127 during the Jin–Song Wars when the forces of the Jurchen-led Jin dynasty besieged and sacked the imperial palaces in Bianjing (present-day Kaifeng), the capital of the Han-led Northern Song dynasty. The Jin forces captured the Northern Song ruler, Emperor Qinzong, along with his father, the retired Emperor Huizong, and many members of the imperial family of Emperor Taizong's bloodline and officials of the Song imperial court. The ordinary Song civilians of Bianjing living in the non-imperial quarter were left alone after being forced to pay huge ransoms to the Jin.

This event marked the collapse of the Northern Song dynasty that originally controlled most of China proper. Many members of the Song imperial family, most notably Zhao Gou (later Emperor Gaozong), managed to escape to southern China, where they reestablished the Song dynasty (known in historiography as the Southern Song dynasty) in the new capital, Lin'an (present-day Hangzhou). This event also greatly contributed to the return of the descendants of Emperor Taizu to the line of succession, as most of Emperor Taizong's descendants were abducted; Emperor Gaozong himself failed to produce an heir as well.

This event is known as the "Jingkang Incident" because it took place during the Jingkang era of the reign of Emperor Qinzong.

Background 
In 1120, under the Alliance Conducted at Sea, the Jin and Song dynasties agreed to form a military alliance against the Liao dynasty and, if victorious, divide up the Liao territories. The Jin would get a large portion of the northern land and the Song would get a smaller portion in the southern region called the Sixteen Prefectures.

Led by Tong Guan, the Song army marched to the Song-Liao border and was stopped by the defensive forest that the Song had maintained since the reign of Emperor Taizu. In order to pass through, Tong Guan ordered the soldiers to clear the forest and continued the expedition into the Liao.

The Jin army sacked the Liao capital of Shangjing and ended the Liao dynasty. The Song army in the south, however, could not even penetrate the Liao's defensive positions and the army was defeated by the remaining Liao troops afterwards. This exposed the limitations of the Song army as well as the corruption and inefficiency in the Song imperial court. In the end, the Jin took control of all former Liao territories.

After the fall of the Liao dynasty, the Song dynasty wanted the Sixteen Prefectures as promised. The Jin dynasty sold the land at a price of 300,000 bolts of silk and 200,000 ounces of silver. This price was considered to be extremely generous because it was the tribute that the Song had been paying to the Liao annually since the Chanyuan Treaty of 1005.

Prelude to the war 
According to the Twenty-Four Histories, in 1123, three years after the fall of Liao, a Jin general Zhang Jue, defected to the Song dynasty. He was governor of the Jin-controlled Pingzhou Prefecture (present-day Zunhua), which was within the Great Wall, but not counted among the Sixteen Prefectures. Nonetheless, the Song imperial court initially welcomed the defection and awarded Zhang Jue an honorific title and land. The Jin dynasty, on the other hand, sent a small army aiming to overturn the defection but was defeated by Zhang Jue's troops.

In 1123 or 1124 (records differ), Jin sent diplomats for Zhang Jue and sacked three Song cities. Panicking, Wang Anzhong (a Song general) killed someone who looked like Zhang Jue and sent the head to Jin. The Jin realized it was a ruse and attacked Song again. Zhang Jue was eventually executed in the winter of the same year. This came too late: in the fall of 1125, Emperor Taizong of the Jin dynasty issued an order to launch a full-scale attack on Song territories.

First Siege of Bianjing 

The Jin armies invaded Song territory from the west and from the north. When the Jin troops reached the former Song-Liao border in Heibei, since the original defensive forest was cleared during 1122 expedition, the Jin troops marched through a defenseless border without impediment. The Jin northern army advanced quickly, sacking Qinhuangdao in October 1125, followed Baoding, Dingzhou, Zhengding and Xingtai in January 1126. This army, commanded by Wolibu (Wanyan Zongwang), did not meet much resistance as most of the Song generals surrendered themselves and their cities as soon as the Jin army arrived. On the other hand, the Jin western army, commanded by Nianhan (Wanyan Zonghan), was held up near the cities of Datong and Taiyuan from the very beginning and did not make much progress for the rest of the war. In February 1126, the Jin northern army crossed the Yellow River and began the siege of Bianjing (present-day Kaifeng), the Song capital. Before the invaders surrounded the city, Emperor Huizong had abdicated in favor of his eldest son, Emperor Qinzong, and fled to the countryside with his entourage. The Jin northern army faced difficult siege fighting that was not well-suited for cavalry. At the same time, the Jin western army was still held up in the Datong area and could not come to the aid of the northern army. In an effort to end the battle sooner, Emperor Qinzong sent his ninth brother, Zhao Gou to the enemy camp for peace talks. The Jin emperor, Emperor Taizong, ordered Zhao Gou taken hostage until the Song imperial court came up with a ransom. Eventually, the Song imperial court came forth with the ransom and the city of Taiyuan was also given to Jin as a gift in good faith. Zhao Gou was released and the Jin northern army started to withdraw.

Second Siege of Bianjing 

Everything went back to normal as soon as the Jin forces retreated. Lavish parties continued to be held daily at the imperial palace. Emperor Huizong returned to Bianjing from the countryside. Song generals suggested that large numbers of troops ought to be garrisoned along the border of the Yellow River. Emperor Qinzong rejected the proposal by citing that the Jin forces might never come back. Many experienced generals who defended the city in the first siege of Bianjing were removed from the capital and posted elsewhere in the country. Many army groups were decommissioned or sent back to their prefectures of origin.

Three months after the first siege of the city, the Jin imperial court sent two ambassadors to Song. The two ambassadors were nobles from the former Liao dynasty. Emperor Qinzong misjudged the situation and believed that they could be turned against the Jin ruler, Emperor Taizong. Emperor Qinzong sent a coded letter which was sealed in candle wax, inviting them to join Song to form an anti–Jin alliance. The two handed the letter to Emperor Taizong right away. Furious, Emperor Taizong ordered an even bigger army to attack Song. This second campaign would eventually topple the Northern Song dynasty.

Since most of the Jin troops had just returned from their first expedition and had not even demobilized, the army was quickly remobilized. Following precedents set in the previous campaign, the Jin army divided into two groups, Wolibu's northern army and Nianhan's western army, even daring to take the same routes again.

In September 1126, the two Jin army groups set foot in Song territory. Unlike the previous battle, however, the western army was able to sack Datong within only one month. Cities like Luoyang and Zhengzhou surrendered themselves, clearing the way to Bianjing. The northern army, having sacked Baoding, Dingzhou and Zhengding in September, regrouped and crossed the Yellow River in November. It then went on a rampage and sacked Qingfeng, Puyang and other satellite cities around Bianjing in December. By the middle of December, the two forces regrouped at Bianjing and the capital was finally besieged.

Unlike the first siege, Bianjing's defenses in the second siege had some fatal flaws:
 Due to the lack of experienced generals and personnel, the whole defense process was unorganized.
 The Jin army was much bigger than the last time. Emperor Taizong sent a 150,000 strong force, having learnt from the first siege, when the western army was held up in Datong and could not advance on Bianjing. This time, however, Datong was sacked within a month, and the full strength of the western army was under the city walls.
 Although Emperor Qinzong called for help and many responded, the rapid deployment of Jin troops made it impossible to aid the city. Song troops from all over the country, including Zhao Gou's troops came to Bianjing but were not able to get into the city.
 Emperor Qinzong's trust in a minister who claimed he could summon "divine soldiers" from Heaven to the battleground was misplaced, causing much wasted time and human lives.

On 9 January 1127, Bianjing fell to Jin forces. Emperor Qinzong and his father, Emperor Huizong, were captured by the Jin army. Thus, the Northern Song dynasty came to an end.

In exchange for the Jin soldiers sparing Kaifeng's ordinary civilian population, the people of Kaifeng gave them wine, meat, silk and gold. Song officials turned over wine, wine makers, painters, weapons, horses, gold, silver and plain silk bolts after the Jin demanded them. Gold and silver were given to the Jin in exchange for Jin soldiers sparing the Kaifeng's people from looting, as well as Buddhist and Daoist books, printing blocks, silk bolts, silk thread  pharmacy pills, parasols, ox carts, old bronze vessels, Buddhist monks, professors, storytellers, painters, clerks, jade carvers,
gardeners, masons, weapons makers, astronomers, musicians, physicians diagrams, maps, headgear worn by consorts, musical instruments, bells and shop, temple and palace lanterns.

Abduction 
On 20 March 1127, Jin troops summoned the two captured emperors to their camps. Awaiting them was a directive from Emperor Taizong that they were to be demoted to commoners, stripped of their ceremonial trappings and Jin troops would compound the imperial palace.

According to The Accounts of Jingkang, Jin troops looted the entire imperial library and the decorations in the palace. Jin troops also abducted all the female servants and imperial musicians. The imperial family was abducted and their residences were looted. All the female prisoners were ordered, on pain of death, to serve the Jin aristocrats no matter what rank in society they had previously held. A Jin prince wanted to marry Emperor Huizong's daughter, Zhao Fujin, who had been another man's wife. Later on, the emperor's concubines were also given to the prince by Emperor Taizong. To avoid captivity and slavery under the Jurchens, many palace women committed suicide.

Emperor Taizong feared that the remaining Song troops would launch a counter-offensive to reclaim the capital. Therefore, he set up in Bianjing a puppet government for the lands south of the Yellow River, called Chu, and ordered all the assets and prisoners to be taken back to the Jin capital – Shangjing (in present-day Harbin). The captives marched to the Jin capital along with the assets. Over 14,000 people, including the Song imperial family, went on this journey. Their entourage – almost all the ministers and generals of the Northern Song dynasty – suffered from illness, dehydration and exhaustion, and many never made it.  Upon arrival, each person had to go through a ritual where the person has to be naked and wearing only sheep skins. Contrary to what was previously thought, the ceremony was drawn from ancient Han Chinese customs, drawn together by Jin experts on Han rather than a Jurchen ritual. Empress Zhu committed suicide because she could not bear the humiliation. Men were sold into slavery in exchange for horses with a ratio of ten men for one horse. Women, especially former Song princesses, became palace slaves in a part of the Jin palace called the laundry hall and others were taken as slaves by Jin princes and others. Some Song princesses became Jin princes' concubines. Someone bought an "ex–royal" for less than ten ounces of gold.<ref>"The Accounts of Jingkang" (靖康稗史箋證)  设也马北上途中就以富金为妻，回到上京后，金太宗诏许，「赐帝姬赵富金、王妃徐圣英、宫嫔杨调儿、陈文婉侍设也马郎君为妾。」 Sheyema married Zhao Fujin during his journey back north. After Sheyema arrived in the Supreme Capital, the Jin Emperor Taizong delivered the following edict: "The Imperial Concubine Zhao Fujin, along with Concubines Xu Shengying, Yang Diao'er and Chen Wenwan are hereby bestowed upon Prince Sheyema.""The Accounts of Jingkang" (靖康稗史箋證) 「以八金买倡妇，实为亲王女孙、相国侄妇、进士夫人」 ("For eight pieces of gold, one purchased a singer who had been a prince's granddaughter, prime minister's daughter-in-law, and minister's wife.")</ref>

In retaliation for Jurchen women being raped by Khitan men, Khitan women prisoners were given as wives to the Han Chinese Song princes when they were both taken into captivity by the Jurchen. The Song male Han Chinese princes who were captured were given Khitan women to marry from the Liao dynasty palace by the Jin Jurchens, who had also defeated and conquered the Khitan of the Liao dynasty in Mongolia. The original Chinese wives of the Song princes were confiscated and replaced with Khitan ones. One of the Song Emperor Huizong's sons was given a Khitan consort from the Liao palace and another one of his sons was given a Khitan princess by the Jin at the Jin Supreme capital (Shangjing, now in Acheng District, Harbin, Heilongjiang province). The Jin Jurchens continued to give new wives to the captured Song royals, the grandsons and sons of Song Emperor Huizong after they took away their original Chinese wives. The Jin Jurchens told the Han Chinese Song royals that they were fortunate because the Liao Khitan royals were being treated much worse by the Jurchen than the Song Chinese royals, Jurchen soldiers were given the children of the Liao Khitan Tianzuo Emperor as gifts while the Song Emperor was allowed to keep his children while he was in captivity. The Jurchens had sacked and destroyed the Khitan Liao supreme capital in Inner Mongolia and burned the ancestral tombs of the Liao Emperors. Emperor Qinzong of Song would spend the rest of his life in Jin captivity, although his status was eventually raised to nobility and he began to receive a stipend.  In 1156, as a humiliation for both men, the former Emperor Qinzong of Song and the former Khitan Emperor Tianzuo of Liao were forced by the Jin Emperor to play a match of polo against each other. Qinzong was weak and frail, and so fell off his horse, while the Khitan Liao Emperor Tianzuo, even though he was quite old himself, was more familiar with horse-riding and tried to escape on his horse, but was shot and killed by Jurchen archers. Khitan Liao royal princesses from the Khitan Liao Yelü royal family and Khitan Xiao family (the Liao dynasty consort clan) were also distributed to Jurchen Jin princes as concubines. Jurchen Prince Wanyan Liang married the Khitan women Lady Xiao, Consort Chen Lady Yelü, Consort Li, Consort Rou and Zhaoyuan. Before the Jurchens overthrew the Khitan, married Jurchen women and Jurchen girls were raped by Liao Khitan envoys as a custom which caused resentment by the Jurchens against the Khitan. Liao Khitan envoys among the Jurchens were treated to guest prostitutes by their Jurchen hosts. Unmarried Jurchen girls and their families hosted the Liao envoys who had sex with the girls. Song envoys among the Jin were similarly entertained by singing girls in Guide, Henan. Song princesses committed suicide to avoid rape or were killed for resisting rape by the Jin.

 Aftermath and appraisal 
The scale of destruction and devastation was unprecedented: treasures, art collections, scrolls from the imperial library were lost on a scale that the Chinese had never seen before. Due to the heavy damage to the country's economy and military, and the loss of talented manpower, the Southern Song dynasty did not recover the lost territories, despite constant fighting between the Song and Jin, the territory was ruled by non-Han Chinese emperors.大金弔伐錄 It would take another 200 years, until the Ming dynasty, to claim back all the territories that the Song dynasty lost.
Many foreign-sounding, non-traditional Chinese family names existing in China today can date back to this incident, as the Han Chinese captives were forced to adopt Jurchen family names. In fact, many members of the imperial family of the Qing dynasty had the surname "Gioro" (e.g. Aisin Gioro, Irgen Gioro); it is believed that they were the descendants of Emperor Huizong and Emperor Qinzong.
This invasion, combined with the later Mongol rule, were speculated to have caused China's advance into capitalism to fall behind by several centuries; although the Ming dynasty later restored the old order, the results of their own fall to the Manchus was to stagnate China once more. This view is supported by the fact that the Song economy had been advanced, and exhibited many features of capitalism. According to this view, the Jingkang Incident holds historic significance in regard to late imperial China's decline.
Researchers in China who published their findings in the People's Political Consultative Daily in 2001, pointed out that this incident led to the transformation of women's rights after the Song dynasty. Since the members of the imperial family who were captured were sold as slaves or concubines, Chinese rulers after the Song dynasty greatly emphasized the importance of sexual norms, especially a woman's chastity and loyalty towards her husband. Chinese rulers of later dynasties instructed that when a woman is confronted between the choice of survival or the honor of chastity, survival is not an option.

 In popular culture 
This incident was referred to as the "Lingering Humiliation of Jingkang" in Man Jiang Hong, a lyrical poem commonly attributed to the Song dynasty general Yue Fei, but was actually written by an anonymous poet in the Ming dynasty.
In The Legend of the Condor Heroes, a wuxia novel by Louis Cha, this national humiliation inspired the Quanzhen Taoist Qiu Chuji to name the two main characters, Guo Jing and Yang Kang, who were born soon afterwards in the storyline.
In Bandit Kings of Ancient China, a video game by Koei, failure to win the game before 1127 results in the Jurchens occupying the entire China in January 1127, ending the game.
Guy Gavriel Kay liberally fictionalized the incident in River of Stars, an alternate historical fiction novel for adults. Kay uses alternate names for historic places and fictional characters.

 See also 
Jin–Song Wars
Timeline of the Jin–Song Wars 
Han Shizhong
Li Qingzhao
Zhou Tong (archer)

 Further reading 
Ebrey, Patricia Buckley. (2013). Emperor Huizong (Harvard University Press; 2013) 661 pages; scholarly biography online review
Ebrey, Patricia Buckley. (1999). The Cambridge Illustrated History of China. Cambridge: Cambridge University Press.  (paperback).
Jing-shen Tao (1976) The Jurchen in Twelfth-Century China. University of Washington Press. .
Franke, Herbert and Denis Twitchett. Alien Regimes and Border States, 907–1368 (Cambridge History of China, vol. 6).  Cambridge University Press, 1994. . Partial text on Google Books.
Kaplan, Edward Harold. Yueh Fei and the founding of the Southern Sung''. Thesis (PhD) – University of Iowa, 1970. Ann Arbor: University Microfilms International, 1970.

References 

Battles involving the Song dynasty
History of Kaifeng
Jin–Song Wars
1127 in Asia
12th century in China
Conflicts in 1127
War crimes in China
Wartime sexual violence
Massacres in China
Chinese war crimes
Emperor Huizong of Song